Berthe Zimmermann (27 September 1902 – 2 December 1937) (also spelled "Berta Zimmermann" and "Bertha Zimmermann"), Swiss communist and wife of Fritz Platten, headed the courier section of the Comintern's OMS (International Liaison Department) in Moscow in 1935 and was purged in 1937.

Background
Zimmermann was born in Zurich, Switzerland, in to a Protestant family on September 27, 1902.

Career
In 1923, Zimmermann emigrated from Switzerland to the Soviet Union, where she worked for the Comintern.  First, she worked for the Information section (1923-1930).  Then (1930-1931), she worked for the Organization section.  Finally (1931 to 1937), she worked for the OMS under Jacob Mirov-Abramov.

After 1935, Zimmermann became head of the OMS's Courier section of OMS.  She went on OMS missions to Paris and Prague.

Personal
Zimmermann was married to Fritz Platten, a fellow communist also of Switzerland.

Death
Zimmermann was executed 2 December 1937 in Moscow.

Platten was arrested in 1938, moved to a prison camp near Nyandoma in 1939, and shot on 22 April 1942.

References

External links 
 

 
 

Swiss communists
Comintern people
1902 births
1937 deaths
Swiss people executed abroad
Prisoners who died in Soviet detention
Great Purge victims
Swiss expatriates in the Soviet Union
People from Zürich
Executed communists